The 2016 WGC-HSBC Champions was a golf tournament played from 27–30 October 2016 at the Sheshan Golf Club in Shanghai, China. It was the eighth WGC-HSBC Champions tournament, and the fourth of four World Golf Championships events held in the 2016 calendar year.

Hideki Matsuyama won by 7 strokes from Daniel Berger and Henrik Stenson. Matsuyama became the first Japanese golfer to win an individual World Golf Championship.

Field
The following is a list of players who qualified for the 2016 WGC-HSBC Champions. The criteria are towards the leaders in points lists rather than tournament winners.  Players who qualify from multiple categories will be listed in the first category in which they are eligible with the other qualifying categories in parentheses next to the player's name.

1. Winners of the four major championships and The Players Championship
Dustin Johnson (2,3,4), Henrik Stenson (3,5), Jimmy Walker (3,4), Danny Willett (3,5)
Jason Day (2,3,4) did not play

2. Winners of the previous four World Golf Championships
Russell Knox (3,4), Adam Scott (3,4)

3. Top 50 from the OWGR on 10 October
An Byeong-hun, Daniel Berger (4), Rafa Cabrera-Bello (5), Paul Casey (4), Kevin Chappell (4), Matt Fitzpatrick (5), Rickie Fowler, Sergio García (5), Branden Grace (5), Emiliano Grillo (4), Bill Haas, Tyrrell Hatton (5), J. B. Holmes (4), Thongchai Jaidee (5), Martin Kaymer (5), Kevin Kisner (4), Søren Kjeldsen (5), Brooks Koepka, Matt Kuchar (4), Shane Lowry (5), Hideki Matsuyama (4), Rory McIlroy (4,5), Francesco Molinari (5), Ryan Moore (4), Kevin Na (4), Alex Norén (5), Louis Oosthuizen (5), Scott Piercy, Thomas Pieters (5), Patrick Reed (4), Charl Schwartzel (4,5,9), Justin Thomas (4), Bubba Watson (4), Lee Westwood (5), Chris Wood (5), Gary Woodland (4)
Jim Furyk, Zach Johnson, William McGirt (4), Phil Mickelson (4), Justin Rose, Brandt Snedeker (4), and Jordan Spieth (4) did not play

4. Top 30 from the final 2016 FedEx Cup points list (if there are less than five available players, players beyond 30th will be selected to increase the number to five)
Roberto Castro, Kim Si-woo, Jason Kokrak, Sean O'Hair, Jhonattan Vegas
Jason Dufner did not play

5. Top 30 from the Race to Dubai as of 17 October
Richard Bland, Grégory Bourdy, Bradley Dredge, Ross Fisher, Scott Hend (6), Andrew Johnston, Rikard Karlberg, Alexander Lévy, Joost Luiten, Bernd Wiesberger
Andy Sullivan did not play

6. The leading four available players from the Asian Tour Order of Merit as of 17 October
Chan Shih-chang, Marcus Fraser, Miguel Tabuena, Wang Jeung-hun

7. The leading two available players from the Japan Golf Tour Order of Merit as of 17 October
Kim Kyung-tae, Hideto Tanihara
Yuta Ikeda did not play.

8. The leading two available players from the final 2015 PGA Tour of Australasia Order of Merit
Nathan Holman, Jordan Zunic

9. The leading two available players from the final 2015 Sunshine Tour Order of Merit
Jacques Blaauw, George Coetzee

10. Six players from China
Dou Zecheng, Li Haotong, Liang Wenchong, Wu Ashun, Zhang Huilin, Zhang Xinjun

11. Alternates, if needed to fill the field of 78 players
The next available player on the Orders of Merit of the Asian Tour, Japan Golf Tour, Sunshine Tour, and PGA Tour of Australasia, ranked in order of their position in the OWGR as of 10 October
Next available player, not otherwise exempt, from Race to Dubai as of 17 October, OWGR as of 10 October, FedEx Cup list:
Song Young-han (Japan)
Lee Soo-min (Asia)
Dean Burmester (Sunshine)
Matthew Millar (Australasia) 
Richard Sterne (Race to Dubai)

Nationalities in the field

Past champions in the field

Note: the HSBC Champions became a WGC event in 2009; winners before this are not listed.

Round summaries

First round
Thursday, 27 October 2016

Second round
Friday, 28 October 2016

Third round
Saturday, 29 October 2016

Final round
Sunday, 30 October 2016

Scorecard

Cumulative tournament scores, relative to par
Source:

References

External links

Coverage on Asian Tour's official site
Coverage on European Tour's official site
Coverage on PGA Tour's official site

2016
2016 in golf
2016 in Chinese sport
October 2016 sports events in Asia